Batrachorhina fuscolateralis is a species of beetle in the family Cerambycidae. It was described by Stephan von Breuning in 1939. It is known from Zanzibar and Kenya.

References

Batrachorhina
Beetles described in 1939